The Great West Run is an annual road running event held through the streets of  Exeter.  It was first run in 1985.  Originally run as a marathon, in recent years it has always been run as a half marathon. In 2009 a course record was set, 
 but the route has gone through numerous changes, with new routes in 2006, 2013 and 2017. In 2013 the event moved from an early May date to an October date. Junior and family 1.5-mile events take place in parallel to the main run.

Sponsorship

For some years it was sponsored by Friends Provident; In 2009 the chief sponsor was the Guildhall Shopping Centre in central Exeter.
In 2014 the event was sponsored by Tozers Solicitors.

Recent winners 
Table of recent winners.

References

External links
Official Great West Run website

Half marathons in the United Kingdom
Sport in Exeter
Athletics competitions in England